Gratian Goldstein is an American bridge player.

Bridge accomplishments

Wins

 North American Bridge Championships (8)
 Marcus Cup (1) 1950 
 Chicago Mixed Board-a-Match (2) 1955, 1958 
 Smith Life Master Women's Pairs (1) 1969 
 Wagar Women's Knockout Teams (2) 1948, 1953 
 Whitehead Women's Pairs (2) 1947, 1948

Runners-up

 North American Bridge Championships (7)
 Blue Ribbon Pairs (1) 1966 
 Chicago Mixed Board-a-Match (1) 1967 
 Rockwell Mixed Pairs (1) 1972 
 Smith Life Master Women's Pairs (1) 1961 
 Wagar Women's Knockout Teams (2) 1945, 1971 
 Whitehead Women's Pairs (1) 1953

Notes

American contract bridge players